Hatay State, also known informally as the Republic of Hatay, was a transitional political entity that existed from 7 September 1938 to 29 June 1939, being located in the territory of the Sanjak of Alexandretta of the French Mandate of Syria. The state was transformed de facto into the Hatay Province of Turkey on 7 July 1939, de jure  joining the country on 23 July 1939.

History

Background

Formerly part of the Aleppo Vilayet of the Ottoman Empire, the Sanjak of Alexandretta was occupied by France at the end of the First World War and constituted part of the French Mandate of Syria.

The Sanjak of Alexandretta was an autonomous sanjak from 1921 to 1923, as a result of the Franco-Turkish Treaty of Ankara, as it had a large Turkish community as well as its Arab and Armenian population. Then it was attached to the State of Aleppo, then in 1925 it was directly attached to the State of Syria, still with a special administrative status.

Marshal Mustafa Kemal Pasha (later known as Mustafa Kemal Atatürk), refused to accept the Sanjak of Alexandretta as part of the Mandate and, in a speech on 15 March 1923 in Adana, he described the Sanjak as "A homeland where Turks lived for centuries and can't be a captive at the hands of enemy". Turkish policy aimed at annexing the Sanjak of Alexandretta when the French mandate of Syria was due to expire in 1935. Turks in Alexandretta initiated reforms in the style of Atatürk's, and formed various organisations and institutions in order to promote the idea of union with the Republic of Turkey.

In 1936, the elections returned two Syrian independentist MPs (favouring the independence of Syria from France) in the sanjak, and this prompted communal riots and passionate articles in the Turkish and Syrian press. In particular, Arab nationalist Zaki al-Arsuzi was influential.

In response, the Atatürk government coined the name Hatay for the Sanjak of Alexandretta, as a reference to Hittites (Syro-Hittite states), and raised the "Issue of Hatay" at the League of Nations. On behalf of the League of Nations, representatives of France, the United Kingdom, the Netherlands, Belgium and Turkey prepared a constitution for the sanjak. The new statute came into power in November 1937, the sanjak becoming 'distinct but not separated' from Syria on the diplomatic level, linked to both France and Turkey for military matters.

On 2 September 1938, the sanjak assembly proclaimed the Sanjak of Alexandretta as the Hatay State. The State lasted for one year under joint French and Turkish military supervision.

On 29 June 1939, following a referendum, the Hatay legislature voted to disestablish the Hatay State and join Turkey. This referendum has been labelled both "phoney" and "rigged", as the Turkish government organised tens of thousands of Turks from outside Alexandretta to register as citizens and vote. The French encouraged the annexation, hoping it would act as an incentive to Turkey to reject an alliance with Nazi Germany.

Hashim al-Atassi, the President of the Syrian Republic, resigned in protest at the continued French intervention in Syrian affairs, maintaining that the French were obliged to refuse the annexation under the Franco-Syrian Treaty of Independence of 1936.

Legislature
The Hatay State Peoples Assembly consisted of 40 members, consisting of 22 Turks, nine Alawites, five Armenians, two Orthodox Greeks and two Sunni Arabs.

Annexation
On 7 July 1939, the Grand National Assembly of Turkey approved the law establishing the Hatay Province and incorporating districts from Adana Province (then Seyhan Province) and Gaziantep Province. By 23 July 1939, the last vestiges of the French Mandate authorities had left Antakya, and the territory was fully annexed by Turkey. The result was a flight of many Arabs and Armenians to Syria. The region's Armenian population, having been survivors of the Armenian genocide,  had fled for their lives to the French Mandate of Syria and therefore weren't able to contemplate Turkish sovereignty. Following the annexation, almost the entire Armenian population of Hatay had settled in Aleppo, with many others moving to Lebanon where they founded the modern town of Anjar near the ruins of its historic castle.

Population and demographics
According to the estimates of the French High Commission in 1936, out of a population of 220,000, 39% were Turks, 28% Alawite Arabs, 11% Armenians, 10% Sunni Arabs, 8% other Christians and 4% were Circassians, Kurds and Jews. Although Turks formed the largest single ethno-religious minority, Arabic speakers, including Sunnis, Alawites and Christians, were more numerous.

In 1937, most sources pointed that out of a total population of 186 thousand people (which is according to the French government's 1932 report) in sanjak of Alexandretta, 85 thousand people were Turks, 25 thousand were Armenians, and the rest was largely made up of Arabs with some Greeks, Jews, Kurds, and Circassians.

In Popular Culture 
A very fictionalized Hatay, with its own potentate and army, is the setting for the climax of the movie Indiana Jones and the Last Crusade.

See also 
Syrian Turkmen
Kars Republic

References

Sources 
 Sökmen, Tayfur: , Ankara 1992, .
 Dr. Abdurrahman Melek, Hatay Nasıl Kurtuldu, Türk Tarih Kurumu, 1966

External links

Former countries in the Middle East
States and territories established in 1938
History of Hatay Province
1939 in Turkey
Syria–Turkey relations
Former countries of the interwar period
1938 establishments in Asia
1939 disestablishments in Asia
States and territories disestablished in 1939